Thy Neighbor's Wife may refer to:

 Thy Neighbor's Wife (book), a non-fiction book by Gay Talese
 Thy Neighbor's Wife (1953 film), an American drama film
 Thy Neighbor's Wife (2001 film), an erotic thriller film

See also
 Thy Neighbour's Wife, a novel by Liam O'Flaherty